Colpothrinax is a genus of palms native to Central America and the Caribbean. Colpothrinax is a member of subfamily Coryphoideae, tribe Trachycarpeae, although its placement within the subtribe is uncertain, on the basis of plastid DNA

Species

References

 
Arecaceae genera
Flora of Central America
Neotropical realm flora